"The Trouble With Normal" may refer to:

 The Trouble with Normal (album), a 1983 album by Bruce Cockburn
 The Trouble With Normal (book), a 1999 non-fiction book by Michael Warner
 The Trouble With Normal (TV series), a short-lived 2000 American television series